Jiji may refer to:

Jiji people, an ethnic and linguistic group in western Tanzania.
Jiji, Nantou, a township in Taiwan
Jiji railway station, a railway station serving Jiji
Jiji Line, a railway line serving Jiji
Jiji Press, a Japanese news agency
Jiji.ng, a Nigerian online marketplace
 Jiji, character in Kiki's Delivery Service
 Jiji, character in the puzzle game Baba Is You

People
 Li Jiji (died 926), imperial prince of the Chinese Five Dynasties and Ten Kingdoms
 Jamshed Jiji Irani (born 1936), Indian industrialist
 Jiji P Joseph (born 1981), Indian film audio engineer

See also

1999 Jiji earthquake, an earthquake that occurred in Jiji, Nantou